The Moroccan Records in Swimming are the fastest times ever swum by an individual from Morocco. These national records are maintained by Morocco's swimming federation, the Royal Moroccan Swimming Federation (FRMN).

FRMN keeps records for both for men and women, for events in long course (50m) and short course (25m) courses. Records are kept in the following events (by stroke):
 freestyle (libre): 50, 100, 200, 400, 800 and 1500;
 backstroke (dos): 50, 100 and 200;
 breaststroke (brasse): 50, 100 and 200;
 butterfly (papillon): 50, 100 and 200;
 individual medley (4 Nages): 100 (25m only), 200 and 400;
 relays: 4x50 free, 4x100 free, 4x200 free, 4x50 medley, and 4 × 100 medley.

All records were achieved in finals unless otherwise specified.

Long course (50 m)

Men

|-bgcolor=#DDDDDD
|colspan=9|
|-

|-bgcolor=#DDDDDD
|colspan=9|
|-

|-bgcolor=#DDDDDD
|colspan=9|
|-

|-bgcolor=#DDDDDD
|colspan=9|
|-

|-bgcolor=#DDDDDD
|colspan=9|
|-

Women

|-bgcolor=#DDDDDD
|colspan=9|
|-

|-bgcolor=#DDDDDD
|colspan=9|
|-

|-bgcolor=#DDDDDD
|colspan=9|
|-

|-bgcolor=#DDDDDD
|colspan=9|
|-

|-bgcolor=#DDDDDD
|colspan=9|
|-

Mixed relay

Short course (25 m)

Men

|-bgcolor=#DDDDDD
|colspan=9|
|-

|-bgcolor=#DDDDDD
|colspan=9|
|-

|-bgcolor=#DDDDDD
|colspan=9|
|-

|-bgcolor=#DDDDDD
|colspan=9|
|-

|-bgcolor=#DDDDDD
|colspan=9|
|-

Women

|-bgcolor=#DDDDDD
|colspan=9|
|-

|-bgcolor=#DDDDDD
|colspan=9|
|-

|-bgcolor=#DDDDDD
|colspan=9|
|-

|-bgcolor=#DDDDDD
|colspan=9|
|-

|-bgcolor=#DDDDDD
|colspan=9|
|-

|-

Mixed relay

Notes

References
General
Moroccan Long Course Records - Men 10 July 2019 updated
Moroccan Long Course Records - Women Updated 12.06.2017
Moroccan Short Course Records - Men 31 December 2019 updated
Moroccan Short Course Records - Women Updated 4.07.2017
Moroccan Mixed Relay Records 23 August 2019 updated
Specific

External links
FRMN web site

Morocco
Records
Swimming records
Swimming